Parkview Health System, founded in 1878 as Fort Wayne City Hospital is a network of 10 community hospitals and more than 100 clinic locations in northeast Indiana and northwest Ohio. The not-for-profit Parkview Health System is the region's largest employer with more than 14,000. Parkview Physicians Group is also part of the Parkview Health, and includes more than 900 providers in more than 45 specialties.

History

Parkview Health traces its roots back to Fort Wayne City Hospital, founded in 1878.   Subsequent hospitals in Parkview’s history include Hope Hospital (1891 – 1922), Methodist Hospital (1922 – 1953), Parkview Memorial Hospital (1953 – 1955) and Parkview Hospital (1955 – ). Parkview Health System, Inc. was incorporated in May 1995.   Parkview Whitley and Parkview Huntington Hospitals joined the system in 1995, Parkview Noble Hospital in 2000, Parkview LaGrange Hospital in 2005, Parkview Wabash Hospital in 2015 and Parkview DeKalb Hospital in 2019.  Parkview Health's flagship hospital campus, Parkview Regional Medical Center, was founded in March 2012.  Parkview has ten hospitals total within its network as of 2021.

As of 2013, Parkview officials announced a facelift of $3.2 million to Parkview Randallia Hospital. It includes a new entryway, new signage, a large courtyard, and a park. An interior facelift was conducted right after the Parkview Regional Medical Center was complete in May 2012, which included turning 150 patient rooms into private, more comfortable rooms. Other highlights include acute and continuing care centers, a surgery area, the Center for Wound Healing, Center on Aging and Health and a full-service emergency department. The facility also offers a family birthing center, imaging and lab services, endoscopy, and a sleep lab.

Graduate Medical Education 
In March 2021, Parkview Health launched a graduate medical education program to attract, train and retain physicians in northeast Indiana. The residency program is a clinical training program for doctors who have graduated from medical school and are ready to receive further specialized training. Parkview’s program is based at Parkview Hospital Randallia and includes internal medicine, a three-year program open to 15 residents each year, and general surgery, a five-year program open to four residents each year.

Awards and recognition 
Two Parkview hospitals were awarded an "A" in the spring 2021 Leapfrog Hospital Safety Grade.  The College of Healthcare Information Management Executives (CHIME) awarded Parkview Health its 2020 Digital Health Most Wired recognition.  Parkview Health was named one of America’s Best Employers by Forbes magazine in 2019.

Billing practices
Parkview has come under scrutiny for its billing practices.  A 2019 report wrote that Parkview charged private insurance about four times the rate it charged Medicare; while many hospitals hike their prices somewhat for non-Medicare rates, Parkview did so to an unusual degree.  Additionally, the hospital has refused to bill Medicaid for some of its patients even when they qualified, instead placing medical liens directly on their property for rates three to five times as high as the Medicaid rate, potentially ruining these patient's credit scores.  The hospital has been sued by a number of aggrieved patients over these practices.  A 2010s Indiana law requires hospitals to bill normal insurance before pursuing additional debts with a lien.  Parkview has argued in court that Medicaid is "government assistance" and not insurance, so the law does not apply to these disputes; plaintiff's lawyers have argued that other hospitals in Indiana treat Medicaid as insurance, making Parkview the outlier.  Parkview lost a court case and the judge held that Indiana law considers Medicaid health insurance.

Services 
Key Parkview Health service lines include heart health, orthopedics, neurosciences, trauma care, cancer care and women’s and children’s services. Other services include Parkview Home Health & Hospice, Parkview Health Laboratories, health and fitness centers, ambulatory care and diagnostic centers, outpatient services center, Parkview Occupational Health, Parkview Employee Assistance Program (EAP), Parkview Workplace Wellness, EMS, the Samaritan flight and ground transport program and more.

Locations 
Parkview Regional Medical Center (Fort Wayne, Ind.)
Parkview Cancer Institute (Fort Wayne, Ind.)
Parkview Heart Institute (Fort Wayne, Ind.)
Parkview Ortho Hospital (Fort Wayne, Ind.)
Parkview Women’s & Children’s Hospital (Fort Wayne, Ind.)
Parkview Hospital Randallia (Fort Wayne, Ind.)
Parkview Behavioral Health Institute (Fort Wayne, Ind.)
Parkview DeKalb Hospital (Auburn, Ind.)
Parkview Huntington Hospital (Huntington, Ind.)
Parkview LaGrange Hospital (LaGrange, Ind.)
Parkview Noble Hospital (Kendallville, Ind.)
Parkview Wabash Hospital (Wabash, Ind.)
Parkview Whitley Hospital (Columbia City, Ind.)
Parkview Warsaw (Warsaw, Ind.)
Parkview Mirro Center for Research & Innovation (Fort Wayne, Ind.)
Parkview Physicians Group – more than 100 locations in northeast Indiana and northwest Ohio

References 

Hospital networks in the United States
Buildings and structures in Fort Wayne, Indiana
Economy of Fort Wayne, Indiana
Medical and health organizations based in Indiana
Companies based in Fort Wayne, Indiana